University Stadium (officially Dreamstyle Stadium from 2017 to 2020) is an outdoor football stadium in the western United States, located on the south campus of the University of New Mexico in Albuquerque, New Mexico.  It is the home field of New Mexico Lobos football, which competes as a member of the Mountain West Conference.

The stadium opened  in September 1960, and currently has a seating capacity of 39,224.

History

Replacement of Zimmerman Field
Before 1960, Lobos football teams played home games at Zimmerman Field, a 16,000-seat stadium which was located just south of the current Zimmerman Library on the university’s main campus.  The growth of the university after World War II, with the concomitant growth in the popularity of varsity athletics, made it clear by the mid-1950s that a new, larger football venue was needed.  Increasing enrollments also meant that space on the main campus was at a premium.  As such, it was decided that a new stadium would be constructed off of the main campus, which would both allow adequate space for a much larger stadium, and free up space for desperately needed academic facilities on the main campus.

The university purchased land for the new stadium south of campus near the corner of Avenida Cesar Chavez and University Boulevard. This land became known as "south campus," and would eventually become the home of the entire UNM Athletic Department.  Today, facilities located on south campus include The Pit, Isotopes Park, the Lobo Tennis Club, Lobo Field, Lobo Softball field, the Rudy Davalos Basketball Center, athletics administration buildings, as well as the football stadium.

The new stadium was christened as University Stadium upon its opening in 1960. It consisted of grandstands along the east and west sidelines and a press box above the west stands. The stadium was built in an arroyo, with the seating bowl created by the piling of excavated fill material to form earthen embankments on which the stands could be built. This "berm" style of construction placed the field below ground level with seats extending both above and below the natural grade.  The initial construction cost of the stadium was just over $4 million. The inaugural football game at University Stadium took place on September 17, with the Lobos defeating the overmatched National University of Mexico Pumas 77–6.

A new press box with private suites was built before the 1976 season at a cost of $1.8 million. Because the stadium had been built on earthen fill, the press box had to be supported on large concrete piers that went down to the pre-existing ground level. In 1995, UNM made a major addition to University Stadium with the construction of the L.F. "Tow" Diehm Athletic Facility, a field house and athletic training facility located just beyond the south end zone.

For its first 52 seasons, the playing field was natural grass. The athletics department announced in late 2011 that it would be replaced with a synthetic playing surface, and infilled FieldTurf was installed prior to the 2012 season.

Naming rights
In 2012, naming rights for the stadium's playing surface were secured by local attorneys Turner and Margaret Branch, who are alumni and long-time donors to the UNM athletic department. Their $1.5 million donation to the “Lobo Leap to Excellence” capital campaign remains the second-largest single gift ever given to the athletic department by a living donor.

On May 3, 2017, UNM announced a $10 million, 10-year naming-rights agreement with Dreamstyle Remodeling, a local Albuquerque construction company, covering both the University Stadium and University Arena. The venues were rechristened as Dreamstyle Stadium and Dreamstyle Arena.

On September 18, 2020, after disputes between the University and Dreamstyle, the name was changed back to University Stadium for the time being; in addition, the Dreamstyle Arena was reverted back to The Pit.

Expansion
The stadium was expanded in 2001, with stands, new bathroom and concessions facilities constructed beyond the north end zone. UNM also added a large, state-of-the-art scoreboard that included the "LoboVision" video screen. In 2004, portable bleachers were donated to UNM by the city of Albuquerque in 2004 to take the stadium's capacity beyond 39,000.

Plans for future expansion have been adopted. The next phase of expansion includes renovations of the stadium's southwest and southeast corners, as well as adding five thousand seats to the south end. Additionally, a tunnel connecting Dreamstyle Stadium and the Tow Diehm Facility has also been planned to allow easier player access to locker rooms during games. When the currently planned renovations are completed, the stadium will seat over 43,000 spectators.

Notable events

Zia Bowl
University Stadium hosted the title game of NCAA Division II Football Championship, named the Zia Bowl, in early December 1979 and 1980. In Zia Bowl I, Delaware defeated , 38–21. In Zia Bowl II, Cal Poly beat Eastern Illinois, 21–13. Attendance was 4,000 or less for both Zia Bowls, and in 1981 the NCAA Division II title game was moved to McAllen, Texas.

New Mexico Bowl
Since December 2006, University Stadium has hosted the New Mexico Bowl. The game was funded by a $2 million line of credit from ESPN. The inaugural edition featured New Mexico against future Mountain West Conference foe San Jose State, then of the Western Athletic Conference. San Jose State won, 20–12. The game was the first NCAA Division I bowl game played in the state of New Mexico.

Soccer
University Stadium hosted a U.S. women's national soccer team Women's World Cup qualifying match against Mexico in May 2004.  Three U.S. men's national soccer team matches have been played in the stadium, with the most recent being a friendly match with Honduras in March 2005.

Concerts
The stadium has hosted concerts by many famous artists, including Metallica & The Rolling Stones, among others.

Gallery

See also
 List of NCAA Division I FBS football stadiums

References

External links

 

1960 establishments in New Mexico
American football venues in New Mexico
College football venues
NCAA bowl game venues
New Mexico Lobos football venues
Soccer venues in New Mexico
Sports venues completed in 1960
Sports venues in Albuquerque, New Mexico